Ganda Lal (date of birth not known) is a Ugandan former first-class cricketer.

He played cricket for Uganda from 1955 to 1964. He played one First-class match for East Africa against the touring Marylebone Cricket Club (MCC) team in November 1963. In the match, batting at number 11, he was not out without scoring a run. In the second innings he was absent hurt and did not bat. In the MCC innings he opened the bowling but only bowled six overs, conceding 23 runs and taking no wickets with an economy rate of 3.83.

References

External links

Date of birth unknown
Possibly living people
Ugandan people of Indian descent
Ugandan cricketers
East African cricketers